Richard Francis Tuck  (born 1 January 1949) is a British academic, political theorist and historian of political thought. He taught at the University of Cambridge from 1973 to 1995. He then joined the faculty of Harvard University, where he teaches as the Frank G. Thomson Professor of Government.

Views on Brexit and the European Union
In his opinion-article, "The Left Case for Brexit" published by the Dissent, Tuck maintains that "the left’s natural position should still be one of opposition to the EU," and that Brexit would open up political possibilities for the Left. In a 17 July, 2017 talk at the Policy Exchange entitled "Brexit: A Prize in Reach for the Left," Tuck advocates for a "genuine Brexit followed by a Labour government" that would both tactically "stall the movement towards independence in Scotland" and politically allow Britain to enact leftist policies, free from the "far-reaching restrictions which the EU imposes on traditional socialism." Tuck also co-authored a November 2017 "Brexit Proposal" with Dr. Christopher Bickerton of Cambridge University. Tuck favours historical international organisations such as the International Labour Organization (ILO) and domestic institutions such as the National Health Service (NHS), which promote socialist goals without compromising democratic processes. In contrast, he cautions against European Union (EU)'s imposition of neo-liberal structures that meet right-wing goals. Tuck criticises the technocratic elite, and regards Brexit referendum as the expression of democratic sovereignty.

Books 
Natural Rights Theories: Their Origin and Development. Cambridge: Cambridge University Press, 1979
Hobbes: A Very Short Introduction. Oxford: Oxford University Press, 1989 
Philosophy and Government 1572–1651. Cambridge: Cambridge University Press, 1993
Rights of War and Peace: Political Thought and the International Order from Grotius to Kant. Oxford: University of Oxford Press, 1999
Free Riding. Cambridge: Harvard University Press, 2008
The Sleeping Sovereign. Cambridge: Cambridge University Press, 2016

Interviews 
 "Democratic Sovereignty and Brexit: A Conversation with Richard Tuck on Political Theory and Practice" International Critical Thought Volume 8, issue 4, 2018.
 "Richard Tuck on Free Riding" Philosophy Bites podcast, Feb. 10. 2008.

References

1949 births
Living people
Academics of the University of Cambridge
Harvard University faculty
British expatriate academics in the United States
Fellows of the British Academy
Historians of political thought